HD 35520 is a single star in the northern constellation of Auriga. It has a white hue and is dimly visible to the naked eye with an apparent visual magnitude of 5.92. The distance to this star is approximately 2,200 light years based on parallax. The radial velocity for the star is, as yet, poorly constrained.

This is an aging chemically peculiar star, or Ap star, in the giant stage of its evolution, with a stellar classifications of A1 III and A1p. The spectrum displays abundance anomalies of helium and silicon. It has been classed as a shell star and has a relatively high projected rotational velocity for its class of 80 km/s. The star has expanded to 23 times the radius of the Sun and it is radiating 1,635 times the Sun's luminosity from its enlarged photosphere at an effective temperature of 7,645 K.

References

A-type giants
Shell stars
Ap stars

Auriga (constellation)
Durchmusterung objects
035520
025471
1795